Ada'ar is a district, or woreda, of the Afar Region in Ethiopia.

See also 

 Districts of Ethiopia

References 

Districts of Afar Region